The Wild Party is a lost 1923 American silent drama film directed by Herbert Blaché and starring Gladys Walton and Robert Ellis.

Plot summary

Cast

References

External links

 
 
 
 

1923 films
American silent feature films
Films directed by Herbert Blaché
Lost American films
American black-and-white films
Silent American drama films
1923 drama films
1920s American films